Penny on M.A.R.S. is an Italian teen dramedy television series that premiered on Disney Channel in Italy on May 7, 2018. The series is a spin-off of the Italian series Alex & Co. The series is commissioned by 3Zero2 in cooperation with The Walt Disney Company Italy. The series premiered on June 4, 2018, on Disney Channel in the United Kingdom. In April 2018, the series was renewed for a second season which premiered on 18 February 2019. The show's third and final season premiered on 17 February 2020, also in the United Kingdom.

Plot 

Penny passes the auditions to enter the M.A.R.S. high school, one of the most exclusive performing arts schools in the world. The M.A.R.S. has strict rules and is very competitive, and Penny and her schoolmates have to pass a daily test. Penny has enrolled with a fake name to hide her identity as the daughter of Bakìa, a popular singer of the time, to acquire esteem in her own right separate from her mother's. Bakìa had previously enrolled her daughter in a boarding school in Switzerland so that she could have a "normal" childhood and not hinder her career.

The only one at the M.A.R.S. who knows her real identity is Camilla, Penny's best friend. Sharing a sister-like relationship until they fall for the same boy, Penny will also have to solve the mystery of who her father is.

Episodes

Cast

Main

Recurring

Production 
In April 2017, it was announced that The Walt Disney Company Italy planned to produce an English language spin-off from the successful series Alex & Co. The start of shooting for the 17-part first season was planned for Autumn 2017. Penny on M.A.R.S. was produced in English instead of Italian because it was believed that the series could be sold better internationally. The characters Penny, Camilla, Bakìa and Freddy Wolf from Penny on M.A.R.S. had performances in the special episodes (the last episodes) of Alex & Co., in which the spin-off series was introduced. On June 29, 2017, the spin-off series after the last episode of Alex & Co. was officially announced in a teaser, thereby also announcing the title Penny on M.A.R.S..

The first table read for the first season was on September 20, 2017. Shooting for the first season began on September 28, 2017, and ended on December 15, 2017. The shooting took place in Milan and the surrounding area. The backdrop of the Music Arts Reiner School (short M.A.R.S.) is the building of the design department of the Bovisa's headquarters of the Polytechnic University of Milan.

Soundtrack 
The first album from the series was released on May 4, 2016, in Italy. It contains the following list of songs:

References

External links 
 

2010s Italian television series
Disney Channels Worldwide original programming
Television series by Disney
Italian children's television series
English-language television shows